Pape Diop may refer to:

Pape Diop, Senegalese politician
Pape Alioune Diop, Senegalese football manager
Papa Bouba Diop, Senegalese footballer
Pape Cheikh Diop, Senegalese footballer
Pape Malick Diop, Senegalese footballer
Pape Diop (footballer, born 2003), Senegalese footballer
Papakouli Diop, Senegalese footballer
Pape Moustapha Diop, Senegalese Basketball player